Benjamin Williams (born April 30, 2002) is an American college basketball player for the Syracuse Orange of the Atlantic Coast Conference (ACC).

High school career
Williams played junior varsity basketball for Riverdale Baptist School in Upper Marlboro, Maryland for two years. He stood 5 ft 9 in (1.75 m) as a freshman and was rejected by many Amateur Athletic Union programs. Williams grew 11 in (28 cm) from 2016 to 2018, and transferred to St. Andrew's Episcopal School in Potomac, Maryland, where he repeated his sophomore year. As a junior, he averaged 16 points, 10 rebounds and three blocks per game, earning First Team All-Met honors. For his senior season, he transferred to IMG Academy in Bradenton, Florida due to concerns over the impact of the COVID-19 pandemic on access to facilities at St. Andrew's. He averaged 16.3 points and six rebounds per game as a senior. Williams was named to the Jordan Brand Classic roster.

Recruiting
Williams was considered a five-star recruit by Rivals, and a four-star recruit by 247Sports and ESPN. He committed to playing college basketball for Syracuse over offers from Maryland, Georgetown and Miami (Florida).

College career
On February 28, 2022, Williams suffered a lower body injury in an overtime loss to North Carolina, which was later determined to be season-ending. He averaged 1.9 points and 1.4 rebounds per game.

References

External links
Syracuse Orange bio

2002 births
Living people
American men's basketball players
Basketball players from Maryland
IMG Academy alumni
People from Bowie, Maryland
Power forwards (basketball)
Small forwards
Syracuse Orange men's basketball players